John Eayres Davis (August 4, 1891 – January 2, 1961) was a college football player and a notable architect in Birmingham, Alabama.

Auburn University
Davis was a prominent fullback for the Auburn Tigers of Auburn University from 1907 to 1911.

1910
Davis was captain in 1910. Auburn was co-champion of the Southern Intercollegiate Athletic Association (SIAA).

1911
He was selected All-Southern in 1911.

Architect
Davis was an architect of the firm of Warren, Knight & Davis in Birmingham. He had previously worked in Detroit.

References

All-Southern college football players
Auburn Tigers football players
American football fullbacks
Players of American football from Alabama
People from Talladega County, Alabama
1891 births
1961 deaths
Architects from Alabama